Donna Smith is a County Supervisor in Dubuque County, Iowa, United States.  She was first elected to that position in 1978.

A Democrat, she ran against incumbent Jim Nussle for his seat in the United States House of Representatives, in 1996 and 2000, and lost both times.

References

External links
Contact info

Year of birth missing (living people)
Living people
People from Dubuque County, Iowa
Iowa Democrats
Women in Iowa politics
County supervisors in Iowa
21st-century American women politicians
20th-century American women politicians
20th-century American politicians
21st-century American politicians